Kenneth Robert Padvaiskas (born May 11, 1968 in Lachine, Quebec) is a Canadian sprint canoer who competed in the late 1980s. He was eliminated in the semifinals of the K-4 1000 m event at the 1988 Summer Olympics in Seoul. Four years later in Barcelona, Padvaiskas was eliminated in the semifinals of the K-2 500 m event and the K-2 1000 m event.

References
 Sports-reference.com profile

1968 births
Canadian male canoeists
Canoeists at the 1988 Summer Olympics
Canoeists at the 1992 Summer Olympics
Living people
Olympic canoeists of Canada
Canoeists from Montreal
People from Lachine, Quebec